Crab fisheries are fisheries which capture or farm crabs. True crabs make up 20% of all crustaceans caught and farmed worldwide, with about 1.4 million tonnes being consumed annually. The horse crab, Portunus trituberculatus, accounts for one quarter of that total. Other important species include flower crabs (Portunus pelagicus), snow crabs (Chionoecetes), blue crabs (Callinectes sapidus), edible or brown crabs (Cancer pagurus), Dungeness crab (Metacarcinus magister), and mud crabs (Scylla serrata), each of which provides more than 20,000 tonnes annually.

Commercial catch

The FAO groups fishery catches using the ISSCAAP classification (International Standard Statistical Classification of Aquatic Animals and Plants). ISSCAAP has a group for crabs and sea-spiders, and another group for king crabs and squat lobsters.

 Crabs and sea-spiders are defined as including "Atlantic rock crab, black stone crab, blue crab, blue swimming crab, dana swimcrab, dungeness crab, edible crab, cazami crab, geryons nei, green crab, hair crab, harbour spidercrab, Indo-Pacific swamp crab, jonah crab, marine crabs nei, Mediterranean shore crab, Pacific rock crab, portunus swimcrabs nei, queen crab, red crab, spinous spider crab, swimcrabs nei, and tanner crabs nei".

The following table summarises crab production from 2000 to 2008, both caught wild and from aquaculture, in tonnes.

Crabs and sea-spiders

See also

 Crab trap
 Alaskan king crab fishing
 List of harvested aquatic animals by weight

Notes

References

Fishing industry
Crabs
Crustaceans as food